An Air Expeditionary Task Force (AETF) is a deployed numbered air force (NAF) or command echelon immediately subordinate to an NAF that is provided as the U.S. Air Force component command committed to a joint operation.

Notional AETF Composition

High Demand/Low Density assets tasked as required: E-3, E-8, U-2, EC-130, RC-135, CSAR

See also
List of Air Expeditionary Wings of the United States Air Force

References

This article incorporates text in the public domain from the U.S. Department of Defense.

Further reading

External links

Military units and formations of the United States Air Force